Winter Solstice: North is the final release of the four part seasons collective created by Coil. Vocalists Rose McDowall and Robert Lee contribute to the song "Christmas Is Now Drawing Near", a traditional Catholic song. The song features Rosa Mundi.

This album was re-released on Moons Milk (In Four Phases).

Track listing

7" version
Side A
 "A White Rainbow" – 5:44
Side B
 "Christmas Is Now Drawing Near" – 3:30

CD version
 "A White Rainbow" – 8:53
 "North" – 3:45
 "Magnetic North" – 8:51
 "Christmas Is Now Drawing Near" – 3:30

References

External links
 
 
 Winter Solstice: North at Brainwashed

1999 EPs
Coil (band) EPs